Charan's Pre-University Course (PU) and Degree college  is a co-educational college and part of the Charan's Group of Institutions (Happy Hours Nursery School and Charan's Public School, Ulsoor, Bangalore), which has been in the service of shaping young minds for many years. Charan's Pre-University (PU) college is offering courses in Sciences and Commerce. Charan's Degree College offers courses in BCom, BBA and BCA affiliated to Bengaluru City University

Courses 
The courses offered for PUC are

COMMERCE:

CEBA (Computer Science, Economics, Business Studies, Accountancy)

SEBA (Statistics, Economics, Business Studies, Accountancy)

HEBA (History, Economics, Business Studies, Accountancy)

SCIENCE:

PCMB (Physics, Chemistry, Maths, Biology)

PCMC (Physics, Chemistry, Maths, Computer Science)

PCME (Physics, Chemistry, Maths, Electronics)

The courses offered at Charan's Degree College are

 BCom
 BCom + CA 
 BCom + ACCA
 BBA
 BCA

Placements

The college offers soft skills development program in the final year of the undergraduate course and assists students in placements according to their course and career requirements. Some of the placements offered are in the area of marketing, sales, accounting, finance, IT, technology, data science and HR.

Activities 
Charan's PU and Degree College conducts a plethora of activities for the students to meet all challenges of the latest emerging trends to become competent in the corporate world. Some activities and clubs are; 
 Sankalp- Women Empowerment Club
 Youth Empowerment and Social Justice Club
 Management Club
 IT Club
 Entrepreneurship Club
 Cultural & Arts Club
 General Awareness Club
 Sports Club
 Literary Club
 Humanities’ Club 
 Technology Club

Location

The college is centrally located in Ulsoor, Bengaluru with quick access to metro, bus stops and other forms of public transport. The Purple line(Metro) to Ulsoor is situated within 5-10 mins of walking distance from the college.

References

Colleges in Bangalore
Pre University colleges in Karnataka